Ken Whittingham is an American television director.

Some of his directing credits include American Housewife, Gilmore Girls, Unbreakable Kimmy Schmidt, Ugly Betty, Still Standing, Community, Yes, Dear, 30 Rock, Californication, Parks and Recreation,  The Middle, The Mindy Project, Parenthood, The Bernie Mac Show, Scrubs, 2 Broke Girls, Everybody Hates Chris, Modern Family, The King of Queens, Rules of Engagement, The Office, My Name Is Earl, Entourage, Suburgatory (also a producer), Bless This Mess Single Parents, American Housewife, Kenan, Dad Stop Embarrassing Me! and The Upshaws.

Whittingham has won five NAACP Image Awards for his work on The Office, 30 Rock and Parks and Recreation.

References

External links

African-American television directors
American television directors
Living people
Place of birth missing (living people)
Year of birth missing (living people)
21st-century African-American people